The 2014–15 Old Dominion Monarchs women’s basketball team represented Old Dominion University during the 2014–15 NCAA Division I women's basketball season. The Monarchs, led by fourth year head coach Karen Barefoot, played their home games at Ted Constant Convocation Center and were members of Conference USA. They finished the season 21–13, 11–7 in C-USA play to finish in a three way tie for fourth place. They advanced to the semifinals of the C-USA women's tournament where they lost to WKU. They were invited to the Women's National Invitation Tournament where defeated Virginia in the first round before losing to Villanova in the second round.

Roster

Schedule

|-
!colspan=12 style=|Non-conference regular season

|-
!colspan=12 style=|C-USA regular season

|-
!colspan=12 style=| C-USA Tournament

|-
!colspan=12 style=|WNIT

See also
2014–15 Old Dominion Monarchs men's basketball team

References

Old Dominion Monarchs women's basketball seasons
Old Dominion